= Quentin Constanciel =

French footballer (born 2000)

Personal information
- Full name: Quentin Constanciel
- Date of birth: 13 July 2000 (age 26)
- Place of birth: France
- Position: Centre-back

Team information
- Current team: Montlouis

Youth career
- 2014–2018: Tours

Senior career*
Years	Team	Apps	(Gls)
2016–2019	Tours II	35	(3)
2018–2020	Tours	2	(0)
2020–	Montlouis	20	(0)
- * Club domestic league appearances and goals as of 20:54, 8 April 2022 (UTC)

Quentin Constanciel (born 13 July 2000) is a French professional footballer who plays as a centre-back for Championnat National 3 club Montlouis.

== Club career ==
Constanciel joined Tours in 2014. He made his professional debut for the club in a 2–0 Ligue 2 loss to Auxerre on 2 February 2018.
